The European Invasion – Doom Troopin' Live is the second live album by American heavy metal band Black Label Society. It was released on DVD in 2006, just before the band's Shot to Hell album. It is ranked at number 4 on the UK Music and DVD Chart.

The DVD contains footage from two different concerts, in Paris and London, and also includes videos from the songs "Suicide Messiah", "In This River", and "Fire It Up", as well as a making-of feature for the "Suicide Messiah" video. It also included is a 50-minute featurette called "Backstage Pass".

On August 24, 2010, The European Invasion – Doom Troopin' Live was released on Blu-ray.

Track listing

Paris chapter
Intro Jam
Stoned and Drunk
Destruction Overdrive
Been a Long Time
Iron Man Interlude
Funeral Bell
Suffering Overdue
In This River
Suicide Messiah
Demise of Sanity
Spread Your Wings
Solo Acoustic Jam
Spoke in the Wheel
Fire It Up
Stillborn
Genocide Junkies

London chapter
Been a Long Time
Suicide Messiah
Stillborn Jam
Genocide Junkies

Credits
Zakk Wylde – vocals, guitar
Nick Catanese – guitar, backing vocals
James LoMenzo – bass, backing vocals
Craig Nunenmacher – drums

References

External links

Black Label Society video albums
2006 live albums
2006 video albums
Live video albums